Gostak is a meaningless noun that is used in the phrase "the gostak distims the doshes", which is an example of how it is possible to derive meaning from the syntax of a sentence even if the referents of the terms are entirely unknown. It is an example of a nonce word.

The phrase was coined in 1903 by Andrew Ingraham but is best known through its quotation in 1923 by C. K. Ogden and I. A. Richards in their book The Meaning of Meaning, and has been since referred to in a number of cultural contexts.

History
Coined in 1903 by Andrew Ingraham, the sentence became more widely known through its quotation in 1923 by C. K. Ogden and I. A. Richards in their book The Meaning of Meaning (p. 46).

Ogden and Richards refer to Ingraham as an "able but little known writer", and quote his following dialogue:

Deriving meaning
This can be seen in the following dialogue:

Q: What is the gostak?
A: The gostak is what distims the doshes.
Q: What's distimming?
A: Distimming is what the gostak does to the doshes.
Q: Okay, but what are doshes?
A: The doshes are what the gostak distims.

In this case, it is possible to describe the grammatical and syntactical relationships between the terms in the sentence—that gostak is a noun subject, distimming is a transitive verb, and doshes is a plural direct object—even though there is no fact of the matter about what a gostak or distimming or doshes actually are.

Cultural references
The phrase appears in a number of subsequent cultural contexts including:

Science fiction

Miles Breuer wrote a story, published in Amazing Stories for March 1930 and now considered a classic, titled "The Gostak and the Doshes" whose protagonist pops into an alternative world in which the phrase is a political slogan that induces sufficient umbrage throughout the populace to declare justified, righteous war. Other writers have picked up on the reference, notably David Gerrold.

Interactive fiction

The phrase is the namesake of an interactive fiction game called The Gostak, written by Carl Muckenhoupt. Most of the text of the game is in an entirely unknown language (fundamentally English in syntax and grammar, but with much of the vocabulary and even idiomatic constructions changed) which the player must decipher, not only to understand the game's text but also to type commands in the same language. For example, the game opens with the following text:

The Gostak won the 2001 XYZZY Awards for Best Use of Medium and Best Individual Puzzle.

Music

"The Gostak Distims the Doshes" is a three movement sonata for prepared piano composed by Hiawatha in 1984. The three movements are:  I. Doshes  ;  II. Distimming  ;  III. The Gostak

The piece is in the collection of the Knight Library of the University of Oregon.

Academic texts

"Of Gostak & Doshes" is the title of an AI-generated Master's thesis by artist Marcelo Agustin Martinez Caram, exploring the use of neural networks to generate semantical text.

See also
Sepulka
Colorless green ideas sleep furiously
Glokaya kuzdra
Jabberwocky
Nadsat
Part-of-speech tagging
Philosophy of language
Pseudoword
Semantics
Stanley Unwin

References

External links

Entry for The Gostak in the IFDB

Semantics